Nils Henrik Asheim (born 20 January 1960 in Oslo, Norway) is a Norwegian composer and organist, living in Stavanger.

Background 
Asheim is educated at Norges Musikkhøgskole and the Sweelinck Conservatory in Amsterdam. His production comprises chamber music, orchestral works, sacred music, musical theater and digital music, and his Lillehammer −94 fanfare is released on record by "Gardemusikken". Asheim is awarded Spellemannprisen twice, in 2005 in the class Contemporary music, for 19 March 2004, Oslo Cathedral and 2010 in the class Contemporary composer of the year, for Mazurka – remaking Chopin. He was also nominated in 2003 in Open class for Kom regn together with Anne-Lise Berntsen. He was awarded Edvard-prisen for "Chase" in 2002 in the class Contemporary music and in 2011 he was awarded Lindemanprisen.

Career 
Asheim’s compositional style is characterized by a modernist attitude. His musical output features a clear, audible structure and often a physical directness. This approach comes to the fore in early works such as the string quartet Genesis, in which short and simplistic motifs are employed as cornerstones in the musical passage. From 1984 onwards, Asheim would subsequently develop an interest in further abstracting of his compositions which would feature complex juxtapositions of varying tempi and directions. Works that represent this compositional direction include the trilogy made up of Water Rings, Water Mirror and Mirrors.

Asheim’s newer works, written post 2000, mark a shift in compositional method, distancing him from a linear thought of development. Asheim now focuses on compositions built up of several “rooms” which he enters and exits throughout the work. The compositional basis is presented at the piece’s start and the subsequent musical passage is devoted to perusing the basis from varying angles. Listening to his works takes the form of exploration of possibilities rather than a continuous process through new stages. The album Broken Line, recorded by the Vertavo String Quartet, serves as a good example of this compositional approach with the featured works Broken Line, Chase, Navigo and Nicht.

Asheim has also demonstrated a strong interest in musical theatre as witnessed by his monodrama Degrees of White for speaking voice and orchestra, featuring texts by novelist Johan Harstad. Another side of his compositional output is classical repertoire, manifested in the recording project Mazurka – remaking Chopin (2010) in collaboration with Gjertrud’s Gypsy Orchestra.

Asheim is also active as an organ improvisator – in solo settings as well as alongside other musicians. A long-standing collaboration with vocalist Anne-Lise Berntsen has resulted in two albums Engleskyts and Kom Regn. 16 pieces for Organ is a solo-improvisational album featuring the church organ of the Oslo Cathedral, an instrument for which Asheim composed a full-length 1998 inauguration work, Salmenes Bok for choir and two organs.

Asheim has also collaborated with a number of jazz and electronica performers including Paal Nilssen-Love, Frode Gjerstad and Lasse Marhaug. He is also co-founder and member of improvisational collective Stavanger Kitchen Orchestra.
Nils Henrik Asheim served as the president of the Norwegian Society of Composers from 1989 to 1991. Since 1991 he has been based in Stavanger, where he has been active on the local music scene, having served as the director of the local branch of Ny Musikk (the Norwegian section of ISCM). Asheim was also instrumental in the 2001 foundation of the contemporary arts center Tou Scene. In September 2012, Asheim was appointed organist at the Stavanger Concert Hall.

Honors 
Spellemannprisen 2005 in the class Contemporary music, for 19 March 2004, Oslo Cathedral
Arne Nordheim's Composer Award 2007
Spellemannprisen 2010 in the class Contemporary composer of the year, for Mazurka – remaking Chopin
Edvard Prize in the class Contemporary music, for "Chase»
Lindemanprisen 2011

Discography 
As composer
 1988. Flere artister. Kruse, Olav Berg, Asheim, Samkopf, Bjørn Korsan Hoemsnes, Ivar Lunde Jr..
 1992. Gaute Vikdal. Skygger. Trombone, one track by Asheim
 1993. Flere artister. New Norwegian violin music III, one track by Asheim
 1995. Borealis, Cikada, mfl. Norwegian contemporary music, one track by Asheim
 1995. Bit 20. Miniatures. Ett spor av Asheim
 1995. Barratt-Dues Junior Orchestra: Asheim, Kraggerud, Grieg, Hellstenius.
 1999. Njål Vindenes. Sequenza guitar, one track by Asheim
 2000. Kyberia. Navigations, one track by Asheim
 2001. Stavanger new music ensemble. 1-2-3 happy happy happy!, works by Schaatun, Ness, Asheim, Hvoslef, Janson
 2007. Vertavokvartetten, Broken line

As performer
 1993. Prisms ; Wie ein Hauch av Yngve Slettholm. Water ; Mirror  by Nils Henrik Asheim, with Cikada a.o.
 1994. Engleskyts. Med Anne-Lise Berntsen
 2002. 16 pieces for organ
 2003. Kom regn. Med Anne-Lise Berntsen
 2005. 19 March 2004, Oslo Cathedral. Orgel, improvisations
 2007. Orkan. Til tekster av Sigbjørn Obstfelder. Med Anne-Lise Berntsen a.o.
 2007. Grand mutation. Med Lasse Marhaug
 2010. Mazurka – remaking Chopin

References

External links 
 Nils Henrik Asheim Official Website
 Nils Henrik Asheim Biography on Ballade.no
 Begrunnelsen Arne Nordheim Composer Award 2007
List of works supplied by the National Library of Norway

20th-century Norwegian organists
21st-century Norwegian organists
Male organists
Norwegian composers
Norwegian male composers
Spellemannprisen winners
1960 births
Living people
Musicians from Oslo
20th-century Norwegian male musicians
21st-century Norwegian male musicians
FMR Records artists